Pingkou Town is an urban town in Anhua County, Hunan Province, People's Republic of China.

Administrative division
The town is divided into 11 villages and 3 communities, the following areas: Xinzheng Community, Jianping Community, Yongxing Community, Fanxi Village, Huayuan Village, Yongjia Village, Pingshan Village, Shanyang Village, Shangsheng Village, Xinxi Village, Jinhui Village, Hongzhu Village, Xinping Village, and Xingguo Village (新正社区、建平社区、永兴社区、范溪村、花园村、漾佳村、平山村、山洋村、上升村、沂溪村、金辉村、洪竹村、新坪村、兴果村).

References

External links

Divisions of Anhua County